Isia cornuta is a moth of the subfamily Arctiinae. It was described by Travassos in 1947. It is found in Brazil.

References

Arctiinae
Moths described in 1947